Albert Township is a civil township of Montmorency County in the U.S. state of Michigan. As of the 2010 census, the township population was 2,526 and slightly decreased to 2,453 in the 2020 census.

Geography

Demographics
As of the 2000 census, there were 2,695 people, 1,229 households, and 822 families residing in the township, with a population density of 40.9 per square mile (15.8/km). The racial makeup of the township was 98.37% White, 0.15% African American, 0.26% Native American, 0.04% Asian, 0.33% from other races, and 0.85% from two or more races. Hispanic or Latino of any race were 0.89% of the population.

Of the 1,229 households, 19.6% had children under the age of 18 living with them, 59.0% were married couples living together, 5.7% had a female householder with no husband present, and 33.1% were non-families. 30.3% of all households were made up of individuals, and 19.2% had someone living alone who was 65 years of age or older.  The average household size was 2.19 and the average family size was 2.68.

In the township, the population was spread out, with 19.0% under the age of 18, 5.1% from 18 to 24, 19.7% from 25 to 44, 28.5% from 45 to 64, and 27.8% who were 65 years of age or older.  The median age was 50 years. For every 100 females, there were 97.6 males; for every 100 females age 18 and over, there were 96.5 males.

The median income for a household in the township was $30,445, and the median income for a family was $35,597. Males had a median income of $33,795 versus $18,241 for females. The per capita income for the township was $18,206.  About 7.5% of families and 10.7% of the population were below the poverty line, including 18.3% of those under age 18 and 5.4% of those age 65 or over.

References

Townships in Montmorency County, Michigan
Townships in Michigan